Hanson UK, formerly Hanson Trust plc, is a British-based building materials company, headquartered in Maidenhead. The company has been a subsidiary of the German company HeidelbergCement since August 2007, and was formerly listed on the London Stock Exchange and a constituent of the FTSE 100 Index.

History
Hanson was built up by James Hanson, later Lord Hanson, and Gordon White, later Baron White of Hull, who set up Hanson Trust in 1964.

Hanson and White were willing to take a wide range of measures to do so, including mass redundancies, and therefore attracted opposition and accusations that they were asset strippers, but from 1979, the company was successful from the shareholders' point of view and respected during the early 1980s, with Hanson (who gave millions of pounds to the Conservatives) admired by Margaret Thatcher.

One of the most notable takeovers, at least to the general public, was the acquisition in 1983, of the United Drapery Stores, or UDS Group, which owned many of Britain's most well known high street clothes shops and department stores, including John Collier, Richard Shops and the chain of Allders department stores. To fund this purchase, Hanson broke up UDS and sold John Collier to a management buy out team, and Richard Shops to Habitat, keeping only the core department store business.

In January 1986, Hanson bought SCM, an American chemicals to typewriters business. This included the paper division that was formerly the Allied Paper Corporation. Hanson sold most of the SCM business units and the headquarters building in New York City for a significant profit.

Its most significant single purchase, however, was probably its takeover of Imperial Tobacco Group in 1986. Hanson paid £2.5 billion for the group then undertook a major reorganisation; divestitures netted £2.3 billion, leaving Hanson with the hugely profitable tobacco business for "next to nothing." Hanson sold off the food brand, Golden Wonder, to Dalgety plc in 1986.

In November 1988, Hanson went on to buy Consolidated Gold Fields for £3.5bn. The Gold Survey was taken on by a new company, now known as GFMS. An attempt in September 1991, to purchase Imperial Chemical Industries, once seen by many in Britain as the nation's leading company but then in decline, was highly controversial, and ended in failure. Hanson did secure the takeover of Beazer, a major housebuilder, that year.

By the mid-1990s, conglomerates were no longer popular with the investment community. Some of the manufacturing businesses were spun off as US Industries in February 1995. In January 1996, Hanson ended its time as a diversified conglomerate by breaking itself up into four separate listed companies: Hanson plc, Imperial Tobacco, The Energy Group and Millennium Chemicals. This cost the group £95 million in professional fees by August 1996.

Lord Hanson stepped down as chairman in December 1997. Led by Andrew Dougal, chief executive from 1997 until 2002, Hanson focused on building materials, becoming the world's biggest aggregates supplier and the second largest supplier of ready-mixed concrete. In November 1999, Hanson acquired Australian building materials business Pioneer International.

Dougal quit the group in early 2002 to "rebalance" his life, leaving with a controversially large pay-off (variously reported at between £400,000 and £660,000, plus a pension top-up of £636,700).

In May 2007, HeidelbergCement announced its intent to purchase Hanson PLC for £11 per share, a deal worth approximately £8 billion. This deal made the combined company the second largest cement and building materials company in the world. The transaction was completed through Heidelberg subsidiary Lehigh UK on 22 August 2007. In December 2014, Heidelberg Cement agreed to sell its Hanson Building Products division to the private equity firm Lone Star for £900 million.

Operations
Hanson UK's principal markets are the major conurbations in England and Wales and the central belt of Scotland. The company supplies heavy building materials such as ready-mixed concrete, asphalt and cement to the UK construction industry.

References

External links
 

Building materials companies of the United Kingdom
Brick manufacturers
Conglomerate companies of the United Kingdom
Manufacturing companies based in London
British companies established in 1964
Manufacturing companies established in 1964
1964 establishments in England
Companies formerly listed on the London Stock Exchange
British subsidiaries of foreign companies